Joseph Kemp may refer to:

Joseph Kemp (organist) (1778–1824), English composer and organist
Joseph A. Kemp (1861–1930), American industrialist
Joseph Kemp (minister) (1872–1933), New Zealand Baptist minister
Sir Joseph Horsford Kemp (1874–1950), British lawyer and Chief Justice of Hong Kong